The Internet Safety Act and the Internet Stopping Adults Facilitating the Exploitation of Today's Youth Act (acronymized SAFETY) were two United States bills introduced in 2009 requiring "a provider of an electronic communication service or remote computing service [to] retain for a period of at least two years all records or other information pertaining to the identity of a user of a dynamic IP address the service assigns to that user."

Neither bill was passed by Congress.

References

Internet law in the United States
Internet censorship in the United States
United States communications regulation